Victoria Trauttmansdorff (born 8 September 1960) is an Austrian actress. She appeared in more than sixty films since 1993.

Selected filmography

References

External links 

1960 births
Living people
Austrian film actresses